John Irwin Sauls II (born November 29, 1949) is a Republican member of the North Carolina House of Representatives. A pastor from Sanford, North Carolina and former Lee County Commissioner, he has represented the 51st district (including constituents in Lee and Harnett counties) since 2017. When Sauls returned to the NC House in 2017, he held the position of Republican Freshman Chair. He has been elected to the NC House a total of 5 times, most recently in 2020.

Personal life
Sauls' son, John Sauls III or "Pastor J3" took over Sauls position as lead pastor at Crossroads Ministries in 2016. Sauls is a Vietnam-era veteran.

Political career
Sauls claimed he was ready to run for commissioner when he was approached by Lee County GOP in 1997 because “God had prepared [him] for it.” Sauls won by a close margin to join the NC House in both 2002 and 2004. In 2016, Sauls ran for House District 51 yet again, and flipped the district when he beat Democratic incumbent Brad Salmon.

Political positions

Education
Sauls voted for the 2017 Republican budget and voted to override the governor’s veto. Starting teacher pay remains at $35,000 under the Republican budget. Many educators, including veterans of 25 years, will only see an increase of $30 a month, merely a tank of gas. Sauls voted “yes” to H13, which capped K-3 class sizes at 22 to 24 students, without providing adequate funding to support the bill. The mandate for smaller class sizes will cost North Carolina school districts as much as $388 million more per year.

House Bill 2
Though he was not in office for the passage of House Bill 2, Sauls did say he supported the "bathroom part." His only criticism of the bill was the manner in which it was passed. Sauls voted to pass House Bill 142, also known as the “HB2 Compromise,” despite pushback from conservative groups that have endorsed him in the past.

Alcohol Consumption and Gambling
Sauls voted “no” on H500, an alcoholic beverage control omnibus bill that would ease regulations on North Carolina’s numerous micro-breweries. Three weeks after it was introduced House Bill 500 was gutted despite support from the state’s more than 200 craft brewers. Sauls voted against S155, the “Brunch Bill,” which allows vendors to sell alcoholic beverages before 10 a.m. on Sunday. Sauls said he couldn’t support the bill “personally.” As a pastor, Sauls doesn't condemn alcohol drinkers but has "preached too many funerals that were alcohol related." John Sauls “had several motor vehicle accidents when…[he] was drinking.” Sauls opposed establishing a state-run education lottery and compared using a lottery to fund education to a “drug dealer who keep selling drugs instead of taking a job.”

Reproductive Rights
Sauls voted for the 2017 Republican budget which allocated money to crisis pregnancy centers, clinics that “discourage women from getting abortions would receive a big boost in state financial support.” Sauls voted to table a budget amendment that would redirect money from the Carolina Pregnancy Care Fellowship to the Department of Health and Human Services.

Environment
Sauls voted for H56, a bill that repealed the Outer Banks plastic bag ban and was called the “junk drawer of environmental laws.” Republican legislators tied funding to monitor GenX in the Cape Fear River to a repeal of the coastal ban on plastic bags. The bill directs $185K to the Cape Fear Public Utility Authority and $250K to the UNCW to monitor and study GenX despite Gov. Cooper asked for $2.6 million in funding. H56 repealed the plastic bag ban in the Outer Banks that had been in effect since 2009 to protect animals like sea turtles. Sauls voted for S131, which deregulated policies that were meant to protect stream beds, beaches and air quality. Sauls voted for H576, which would have allowed the spraying of "garbage juice" without a permit. H576 would allow landfill operators to “dispose” of landfill fluids by “spraying it into the air over their property” without a permit. Communities where over half the residents are people of color are 2.8 more likely to be near a solid waste facility, according to research published in Environmental Health Perspectives. Sauls voted for S16, a business regulatory reform bill that “imposes limitations on local governments’ power over landfill permits.” Senate Bill 16 is a “16-page grab bag of deregulation provisions. It loosens water quality rules and imposes limitations on local governments power over landfill permits, changes that the Democratic governor called dangerous in his veto message.”

Voter ID
In a statement to the Sanford Herald, Sauls said he has “never understood the opposition” to voter ID requirements. Sauls said he doesn’t “see how a statewide election law can target African-Americans.”

Committee assignments

2021-2022 Session
Commerce (Chair)
Ethics (Chair)
Education - Community Colleges (Vice Chair)
Education - K-12 
Energy and Public Utilities
Finance
Redistricting

2019-2020 Session
Appropriations (Vice Chair)
Appropriations - Education (Chair)
Ethics (Chair)
Education - Community Colleges (Chair)
Redistricting (Vice Chair)
Energy and Public Utilities
Judiciary

2017-2018 Session
Appropriations
Appropriations - Education
Appropriations - Health and Human Services
Education - Community Colleges (Chair)
Energy and Public Utilities
Judiciary II
Commerce and Job Development
State and Local Government II

Electoral history

2020

2018

2016

2004

2002

References

External links

|-

Living people
1949 births
People from Wilson, North Carolina
People from Sanford, North Carolina
County commissioners in North Carolina
Republican Party members of the North Carolina House of Representatives
21st-century American politicians